Foreign relations of Kosovo are accomplished by efforts of the Ministry of Foreign Affairs of Kosovo. Kosovo operates 33 embassies abroad and is host to 22 embassies in Pristina. Kosovo has membership in several international organisations.

On 17 February 2008, members of the Assembly of Kosovo declared independence from Serbia. This move was controversial among the international community. International supervision over the direction of the assembly ended in September 2012, and Kosovo became responsible for its own governance. The Republic of Kosovo has been recognised by 118 UN member states, the Republic of China (Taiwan), the Cook Islands, and Niue. Serbia and other member states consider Kosovo as an autonomous region of Serbia.

The current Foreign Minister of Kosovo is Donika Gërvalla-Schwarz.

Status of diplomatic relations
The Ministry of Foreign Affairs of the Republic of Kosovo has initiated the process of establishing diplomatic relations with all states that have recognised Republic of Kosovo, either by opening new missions or through accreditation of non-resident ambassadors to these countries.

Membership in international organisations

Enver Hoxhaj, Kosovo's Minister of Foreign Affairs during 2011–14 and 2016–17, stated in November 2013 that the country was considering making applications for membership in three United Nations specialized agencies in the first half of 2013, and that an application for membership of the Council of Europe in 2014 was being prepared. Deputy Prime Minister Hashim Thaçi reiterated the state's desire to join in December 2014. Kosovo is also preparing a membership application for the World Trade Organization. Joining NATO's Partnership for Peace is a priority of the government.

Hoxhaj said in 2014 that Kosovo's goal is to be a full UN member state by 2020 and a NATO member state by 2022.

On 15 December 2022 Kosovo filed a formal application to become a member of the European Union.

Names used to represent Kosovo

Kosovo is represented under the name:
"Republic of Kosovo";
"Kosovo*" (with an asterisk),
depending on the particular international forum. A list is set out above. The name "Republic of Kosovo" is self-explanatory and is the preferred nomenclature of the Pristina Government. The name "Kosovo*" with an asterisk is used in other fora. Where this name is used, the asterisk is linked to a footnote which reads:

This "Kosovo*" designation was the outcome of an arrangement agreed to between Pristina and Belgrade in talks mediated by the European Union. This arrangement, which has been dubbed the "asterisk agreement" was agreed in an 11-point arrangement agreed on 24 February 2012.

"UNMIK" is an acronym for the United Nations Interim Administration Mission in Kosovo, which has joined several organizations on behalf of Kosovo.

International treaties and conventions

See also
International recognition of Kosovo
Membership of Kosovo in international organizations
List of diplomatic missions of Kosovo
Membership of Kosovo in international sports federations
International Court of Justice advisory opinion on Kosovo's declaration of independence
Kosovo–Serbia relations
Bosnia and Herzegovina–Kosovo relations
Visa policy of Kosovo
Foreign relations of Yugoslavia

Annotations

References

 
Independence of Kosovo